Acacia incurvaneura, also known as narrow-leaf wattle, is a shrub belonging to the genus Acacia and the subgenus Juliflorae that is endemic to central and western Australia.

Description
The ribbed and resinous branchlets has resinous new shoots. Like most species of Acacia it has phyllodes rather than true leaves. The grey to grey-green phyllodes are ascending to erect with a narrowly linear shape that are commonly shallowly  incurved.

Distribution
The species is found in arid areas in Western Australia, northern and central South Australia and southern parts of the Northern Territory. In Western Australia it is native to an area in the Mid West, Pilbara and Goldfields regions. It is usually situated on in gently undulating country or plains and frequently over hardpan or on low rocky hills where it tends to grow in red-brown sandy loam or skeletal soils as a part of mixed Acacia shrubland or open woodland communities.

See also
List of Acacia species

References

incurvaneura
Acacias of Western Australia
Plants described in 2012
Taxa named by Bruce Maslin
Flora of South Australia
Flora of the Northern Territory